Booher is a surname.  Notable people with the surname include:

 Charles F. Booher
 Charles T. Booher
 Darwin L. Booher
 Dee Booher (born 1951), American actress, wrestler, and roller derby skater
 Dianna Booher